Darwin Ríos Pinto (born 25 April 1991) is a Bolivian international footballer who plays for Club Aurora, as a striker.

Career
Born in La Bélgica, Ríos has played in Bolivia and Moldova for Guabirá, Sheriff Tiraspol and Blooming.

He made his international debut for Bolivia in 2011.

References

1991 births
Living people
People from Santa Cruz Department (Bolivia)
Bolivian footballers
Bolivian expatriate footballers
Bolivia international footballers
Guabirá players
Club Blooming players
FC Sheriff Tiraspol players
Club Aurora players
Moldovan Super Liga players
Bolivian Primera División players
Expatriate footballers in Moldova
Bolivian expatriate sportspeople in Moldova
Association football forwards